Cesare Burali-Forti (13 August 1861 – 21 January 1931) was an Italian mathematician, after whom the Burali-Forti paradox is named.

Biography
Burali-Forti was born in Arezzo, and was an assistant of Giuseppe Peano in Turin from 1894 to 1896, during which time he discovered a theorem which Bertrand Russell later realised contradicted a previously proved result by Georg Cantor. The contradiction came to be called the Burali-Forti paradox of Cantorian set theory.  He died in Turin.

Books by C. Burali-Forti
 Analyse vectorielle générale: Applications à la mécanique et à la physique. with Roberto Marcolongo (Mattéi & co., Pavia, 1913).
 Corso di geometria analitico-proiettiva per gli allievi della R. Accademia Militare (G. B. Petrini di G. Gallizio, Torino, 1912).
 Geometria descrittiva (S. Lattes & c., Torino, 1921).
 Introduction à la géométrie différentielle, suivant la méthode de H. Grassmann (Gauthier-Villars, 1897).
 Lezioni Di Geometria Metrico-Proiettiva (Fratelli Bocca, Torino, 1904).
 Meccanica razionale with Tommaso Boggio (S. Lattes & c., Torino, 1921).
  Logica Matematica (Hoepli, Milano, 1894).
   Complete listing of publications and bibliography, 8 pages.

Bibliography
Primary literature in English translation:
Jean van Heijenoort, 1967. A Source Book in Mathematical Logic, 1879-1931. Harvard Univ. Press.
1897. "A question on transfinite numbers," 104-11.
1897. "On well-ordered classes," 111-12.

Secondary literature:
Ivor Grattan-Guinness, 2000. The Search for Mathematical Roots 1870-1940. Princeton Uni. Press.

References

External links
 
 "Introduction to Differential Geometry, following the method of H. Grassmann" (English translation)

1861 births
1931 deaths
20th-century Italian mathematicians
Set theorists